Kim Jun-han (born March 29, 1983) is a South Korean actor, film director and screenwriter.

Career 
In August 2022, Kim ended his contract with HODU&U Entertainment after two years and was a free agent. On October 31, 2022, Kim signed with Artist Company.

Filmography

Film

Television series

Awards and nominations

References

External links
 
 

1983 births
Living people
South Korean male film actors
South Korean male television actors
South Korean film directors
South Korean screenwriters
21st-century South Korean male actors